Luboš Hilgert (born 25 October 1960 in Prague) is a Czechoslovak-Czech slalom canoeist who competed in the 1980s and 1990s. He won five medals at the ICF Canoe Slalom World Championships with a silver (K1: 1981) and four bronzes (K1: 1985, K1 team: 1983, 1991, 1993).

Hilgert also competed in two Summer Olympics, earning his best finish of 18th in the K1 event at Atlanta in 1996 Summer Olympics.

He is the husband of Štěpánka Hilgertová, a slalom canoeist who competed for Czechoslovakia and the Czech Republic in six Summer Olympics. Their son Luboš Hilgert is also an active slalom canoeist. Amálie Hilgertová is his niece.

World Cup individual podiums

References

External links

Sports-reference.com profile

1960 births
Canoeists at the 1992 Summer Olympics
Canoeists at the 1996 Summer Olympics
Czech male canoeists
Czechoslovak male canoeists
Living people
Olympic canoeists of Czechoslovakia
Olympic canoeists of the Czech Republic
Medalists at the ICF Canoe Slalom World Championships
Canoeists from Prague